Saint Dotto (died 502) was said to have founded a monastery on one of the Orkney Islands, which bore his name. However, there is no island by that name, and no evidence that he existed. His feast day is 9 April.

Dubious existence

The tale of Saint Dotto, after whom one of the Orkney Islands was named, with his feast date of 9 April, appears to be based only on David Camerarius's Scottish Menology.
Camerarius says he lived after churches and monasteries in the Orkneys had been dedicated to Saint Brendan, but that he died in 502 AD.
The Bollandists are therefore skeptical about his existence.
John O'Hanlon notes that Camerarius gives no sources for his information and that there is no island by that name.

Monks of Ramsgate account

The monks of St Augustine's Abbey, Ramsgate wrote in their Book of Saints (1921),

Butler's account

The hagiographer Alban Butler (1710–1773) wrote in his Lives of the Fathers, Martyrs, and Other Principal Saints under April 9,

O'Hanlon's account

John O'Hanlon (1821–1905) in his Lives of the Irish saints wrote,

Notes

Sources

 

 

Medieval Scottish saints
502 deaths